Jonah Williams may refer to:

Jonah Williams (defensive lineman) (born 1995), American football player
Jonah Williams (offensive lineman) (born 1997), American football player